The South Africa national women's cricket team toured England in 2007, playing two Women's Twenty20 Internationals, one against England, and one against New Zealand, and two 50 over matches against the England Development Squad. The two T20Is were the first ever played by South Africa in the format.

Twenty20 Internationals

New Zealand

England

Tour matches

References

2007 in English cricket
Women's cricket tours of England
England
2007 in English women's sport
2007 in South African women's sport
2007 in women's cricket
August 2007 sports events in the United Kingdom